Bollendorf is a German municipality in the state of Rhineland-Palatinate, located on the left bank of the Sauer river, opposite the Luxembourgish town of Bollendorf-Pont.

References 

Germany–Luxembourg border crossings
Bitburg-Prüm